Ludovic Tézier (born 1968 in Marseille) is a French operatic baritone.

Biography 
Ludovic Tézier trained at the Paris Opéra’s École d’Art lyrique and at the Centre National d’Artistes Lyriques. He was a prize winner at Operalia, The World Opera Competition in 1998. He made his debut with the Lucerne Opera and then joined Opéra National de Lyon where he sang the title role in Mozart's Don Giovanni and the Count in the same composer's Le Nozze di Figaro, as well as in Donizetti's Don Pasquale and L'Elisir d'Amore. Tézier has appeared at many of the world's opera houses in a repertoire including works by Verdi, Wagner, Massenet, and Puccini. He has given solo recitals and appeared in concerts in  Vienna, Strasbourg, Paris and other cities and has made numerous recordings and DVDs of operas and other musical works. Tézier was awarded the Chevalier de Ordre des Arts et des Lettres.

Discography

References 

1968 births
Living people
Musicians from Marseille
French operatic baritones
Chevaliers of the Ordre des Arts et des Lettres
20th-century French  male opera singers
21st-century French  male opera singers
Operalia, The World Opera Competition prize-winners